Revolutionary Socialist Party of India (Marxist) was a political party in Kerala, India. It was formed by the  former Labour Minister of Kerala, Babu Divakaran in 2005. Divakaran broke away from the RSP(B).  In 2008 the party merged with the SP. In 2011, Babu Divakaran quit SP and subsequently RSP(M) merged with RSP.

See also
Revolutionary Socialist Party
Revolutionary Socialist Party of Kerala(Bolshevik)
Kerala Revolutionary Socialist Party(Baby John)

References

Marxist parties
Political parties established in 2005
Defunct political parties in Kerala
Defunct communist parties in India
2005 establishments in Kerala
Political parties disestablished in 2011